Moon Duo is a psychedelic rock band from San Francisco, California formed in 2009 by Wooden Shjips guitarist Ripley Johnson and Sanae Yamada.

History
Their debut album Mazes was released on Sacred Bones Records in 2011. The band's style is inspired by psychedelic rock, combining repetitive rhythms and saturated guitars. Their influences include Alan Vega of Suicide, Spacemen 3 and Silver Apples. The band's seventh full-length album, Stars Are the Light, was released on September 27, 2019.

Their most recent album, Stars Are the Light was released to favorable reviews. Stereogum named it album of the week on September 19, 2019, saying "With their latest album, Moon Duo were thinking about dance, and as such Stars Are the Light comes with surprising touchstones, with Johnson and Yamada looking back to '70s funk and disco." Metacritic gave the album a score of 77 out of 100.

Discography

Studio albums 
 Escape (2010)
 Mazes (2011)
 Mazes Remixed (2011)
 Circles (2012)
 Circles Remixed (2013)
 Live in Ravenna (2014)
 Shadow of the Sun (2015)
 Occult Architecture Vol. 1 (2017)
 Occult Architecture Vol. 2 (2017)
 Stars Are the Light (2019)

Singles  

 Planet Caravan (2020)

EPs 

 Killing Time (2009)

Compilations 

Occult Architecture Vols 1 & 2 (2017)

References

External links

 

Sacred Bones Records artists